Mikko Otto Petteri Niemi (born 12 May 1985 in Kangasala) is a Finnish retired basketball player. 185 cm tall point guard Niemi played in Korisliiga for his foster club Tampereen Pyrintö (Pyrbasket) for three seasons before departing to Youngstown State University, where he stayed between 2005 and 2009. After that he played for one more season in Korisliiga, this time in Lappeenrannan NMKY.

Niemi played also two matches in Finland national basketball team in 2004.

Sources

References

1985 births
Living people
Tampereen Pyrintö players
Finnish men's basketball players
Point guards
Sportspeople from Pirkanmaa